Camerano Casasco is a comune (municipality) in the Province of Asti in the Italian region Piedmont, located about  southeast of Turin and about  northwest of Asti.

Camerano Casasco borders the following municipalities: Chiusano d'Asti, Cinaglio, Cortandone, Cortazzone, Montechiaro d'Asti, and Soglio.

References

External links
 Official website

Cities and towns in Piedmont